Konecranes Oyj (KCI Konecranes prior to 16 March 2007) is a Finnish company, headquartered in Hyvinkää, which specialises in the manufacture and service of cranes and lifting equipment as well as the service of machine tools. The firm produces about one in ten of the world's cranes, of which around 80% are for use in factories, the rest at ports. The company was initially a division of KONE, who began to manufacture cranes and hoists in the 1930s, but was spun off as an independent company in 1994 when KONE underwent extensive restructuring. The firm listed on the Helsinki Stock Exchange two years later and has since grown to become a constituent member of the benchmark OMX Helsinki 25 index. Konecranes is arranged into two business divisions - Equipment and Service (covering crane maintenance, safety and machine tool service).

References

External links

Manufacturing companies of Finland
Engineering companies of Finland
Companies established in 1994
Companies of Finland
Companies listed on Nasdaq Helsinki